Campisi is an Italian surname. Notable people with the surname include:

 Gabriel Campisi (born 1968), American film producer, director and screenwriter
 Judith Campisi, American biogerontologist
 Luisito Campisi (born 1987), Italian footballer
 Sal Campisi (born 1942), American baseball player

References 

Italian-language surnames